"The World Is Outside" is a song by English indie pop band Ghosts. It was the second single to be released from the band's first album, The World Is Outside. It was released on 4 June 2007 and reached a peak position of #35 in the UK Singles Chart.

Track listings
All songs written and composed by Ghosts, except where noted.

Download 1

Download 2

7" vinyl

CD single 1

CD single 2

promo CD single

Chart performance

References

2007 singles
Ghosts (band) songs
2007 songs